Faig Garayev (born 15 October 1959 Agstafa) is an Azerbaijani volleyball coach and former volleyball player.

Managerial career
Garayev was born in 1959 to a middle-class family in Astara.

Honours

Manager

Azerrail Baku
CEV Women's Challenge Cup
 Winner: 2010/2011
Women's CEV Top Teams Cup:
 Winner: 2001/2002
 Third place : 1992/1993

Individual
Shohrat Order: 2007

References

External links
FIVB profile

1959 births
Living people
People from Astara, Azerbaijan
Azerbaijani men's volleyball players
Volleyball coaches